Saxapahaw is a census-designated place (CDP) and unincorporated area in Alamance County, North Carolina, United States. It is part of the Burlington, North Carolina Metropolitan Statistical Area. The population was 1,648 at the 2010 census.

History

The Former Saxapahaw Spinning Mill and James Monroe Thompson House are listed on the National Register of Historic Places. The name Saxapahaw is from the Catawban /sak'yápha:/, which is composed of /sak/ ("hill") and /yápha:/ ("step").

Geography

Demographics

As of the census of 2000, there were 1,418 people, 541 households, and 399 families residing in the CDP. The population density was 270.1 people per square mile (104.3/km2). There were 577 housing units at an average density of 109.9 per square mile (42.4/km2). The racial makeup of the CDP was 81.24% White, 13.40% African American, 0.07% Native American, 0.42% Asian, 3.46% from other races, and 1.41% from two or more races. Hispanic or Latino of any race were 6.21% of the population.

There were 541 households, out of which 37.3% had children under the age of 18 living with them, 55.6% were married couples living together, 13.1% had a female householder with no husband present, and 26.1% were non-families. 19.4% of all households were made up of individuals, and 6.1% had someone living alone who was 65 years of age or older. The average household size was 2.62 and the average family size was 3.00.

In the CDP the population was spread out, with 25.9% under the age of 18, 8.0% from 18 to 24, 34.2% from 25 to 44, 24.2% from 45 to 64, and 7.8% who were 65 years of age or older. The median age was 34 years. For every 100 females, there were 99.2 males. For every 100 females age 18 and over, there were 96.4 males.

The median income for a household in the CDP was $37,204, and the median income for a family was $51,528. Males had a median income of $30,152 versus $27,625 for females. The per capita income for the CDP was $18,055. About 7.9% of families and 9.7% of the population were below the poverty line, including 8.1% of those under age 18 and 34.6% of those age 65 or over.

Textiles
Saxapahaw, like most communities in Alamance County, was a mill town built around the community's cotton mill and along the Haw River. The first mill was built in the community in 1844 by the Quaker settler John Newlin, but was later demolished to make way for a brick structure. The current mill building was owned and operated by Dixie Yarns until 1994, when a tornado damaged the structure and operations never resumed. Building remodeling was completed in 2006 and the facility, now known as Rivermill, houses apartments.

The Haw River Ballroom is a music venue set in the former Dye House of Saxapahaw's historic cotton mill.

Notable people
 Whammy Douglas, native of Saxapahaw and professional baseball pitcher, who played for the 1957 Pittsburgh Pirates
 B. Everett Jordan, US senator from North Carolina

References

External links

 Saxapahaw Rivermill
 Our State magazine article

Company towns in North Carolina
Census-designated places in Alamance County, North Carolina
Populated places established in 1844